Kingcol was a British Army flying column created during the Anglo-Iraqi War.

Creation and composition
Kingcol was created to allow a portion of Habforce to relieve RAF Habbaniya as soon as possible.  The column was named after its commander, Brigadier J.J. Kingstone.  Kingcol comprised 4th Cavalry Brigade, 237th Battery 60th (North Midland) Field Regiment, Royal Artillery 1st Battalion Essex Regiment,  one anti-tank troop, Royal Artillery, Number 2 Armoured Car Company RAF, and two supply companies, Royal Army Service Corps.  The 4th Cavalry Brigade comprised Composite Household Cavalry Regiment, the Warwickshire Yeomanry, and the Royal Wiltshire Yeomanry.

See also
 Anglo-Iraqi War
 Iraqforce
 Habforce
 Gocol
 Mercol
 Harcol

Notes 
Footnotes

Citations

References

External links

Military units and formations established in 1941
Military units and formations of the British Army in World War II
Ad hoc units and formations of the British Army
Military history of Iraq
Military units and formations disestablished in 1941
Iraq–United Kingdom relations